In topology, a branch of mathematics, a discrete two-point space is the simplest example of a totally disconnected discrete space.  The points can be denoted by the symbols 0 and 1.

Properties 

Any disconnected space has a continuous mapping which is not constant onto the discrete two-point space.  Conversely if a nonconstant continuous mapping  to the discrete two-point space exists from a topological space, the space is disconnected.

See also 

 List of topologies

References 

Topological spaces